Moses is a free software, statistical machine translation engine that can be used to train statistical models of text translation from a source language to a target language, developed by the University of Edinburgh. Moses then allows new source-language text to be decoded using these models to produce automatic translations in the target language. Training requires a parallel corpus of passages in the two languages, typically manually translated sentence pairs. Moses is released under the LGPL licence and available both as source code and binaries for Windows and Linux. Its development is primarily supported by the EuroMatrix project, with funding by the European Commission.

Among its features are:
 A beam search algorithm that quickly finds the highest probability translation within a number of choices
 Phrase-based translation of short text chunks
 Handles words with multiple factored representations to enable the integration of linguistic and other information (e.g., surface form, lemma and morphology, part-of-speech, word class)
 Decodes ambiguous forms of a source sentence, represented as a confusion network, to support integration with upstream tools such as speech recognizers
 Support for large language models (LMs) such as IRSTLM (an exact LM using memory-mapping) and RandLM (an inexact LM based on Bloom filters)

See also 

 Apertium
 OpenLogos
 Comparison of machine translation applications
 Machine translation

References

Further reading
 Philipp Koehn, Hieu Hoang, Alexandra Birch, Chris Callison-Burch, Marcello Federico, Nicola Bertoldi, Brooke Cowan, Wade Shen, Christine Moran, Richard Zens, Chris Dyer, Ondrej Bojar, Alexandra Constantin, Evan Herbst. (2007) "Moses: Open Source Toolkit for Statistical Machine Translation". Annual Meeting of the Association for Computational Linguistics (ACL), demonstration session, Prague, Czech Republic, June 2007.

External links
 
 IRSTLM Homepage
 RandLM Homepage

Machine translation software
Natural language processing toolkits
Free software programmed in C++
Statistical natural language processing